The St. Andrew's Society of Hong Kong (香港聖安度會) is a Scottish club in Hong Kong established in 1881.

History
In the early 19th century, Canton was the centre of China's foreign trade and the base of the foreign trading community. Several St. Andrew's Dinners, celebration of the St. Andrew's Day, were held during the 1830s in Canton. Being closely associated with the Jardine, Matheson & Co. which was established by the Scotsmen, the Scottish community were strong in Canton as well as Hong Kong, where the Jardine Matheson & Co. set up their headquarters and established their offices and accommodation at East Point after it was occupied by Britain in 1841.

The St. Andrew’s Dinners were held at East Point from the 1850s until it was moved to the Hong Kong Club in Central, at that time located at the corner of Queen’s Road Central and Wyndham Street.

The St. Andrew’s Dinners were turned into an Annual Ball from 1877. Before 1881, the Ball was held by an ad-hoc committee. In 1882, when the St. Andrew's Society was established, Society has been responsible for the St. Andrews's Ball and later the Burns Night.

The St. Andrew's Challenge Quaich (聖安度挑戰碟), which is now held every year at the Happy Valley Racecourse, is founded and awarded by the Society.

Past Chieftains

 Mr. Phineas Ryrie, 1882–90
 Mr. J. J. Keswick, 1890–92
 Mr. David Gillies, 1892–93
 Mr. J. J. Keswick, 1893–94
 Mr. Fullarton Henderson, 1895–96
 Mr. J. H. Stewart Lockhart, K.C.M.G., 1896–97
 Mr. J. J. Bell Irving, 1897–99
 Capt. C. G. Anderson, 1899–1900
 Mr. James McKie, 1900–01
 Mr. T. H. Whitehead, 1901–02
 Mr. H. W. Robertson, 1902–03
 Mr. G. W. Playfair, 1903–04
 Mr. Alex Rennie, 1904–05
 Sir Gershom Stewart, K.B.E., 1905–06
 Mr. T. F. Hough, 1906–07
 Mr. Robert Shewan, 1907–08
 Mr. W. Chatham, C.M.G., 1908–09
 Mr. J. R. M. Smith, 1909–10
 Mr. Murray Stewart, 1910–11
 Mr. C. H. Ross, 1911–12
 Mr. W. Dickson, 1912–13
 Mr. J. W. C. Bonnar, 1913–14
 Mr. David Landale, 1914–15
 Mr. Donald Macdonald, 1915–16
 Mr. A. G. Gordon, 1916–17
 Mr. C. E. Anton, 1917–18
 Mr. R. M. Dyer, 1918–19
 Mr. G. M. Young, M.B.E., 1919–20
 Mr. John Johnstone, 1920–21
 Mr. A. O. Lang, 1921–22
 Mr. A. G. Stephen, 1922–23
 Mr. R. Sutherland, O.B.E., 1923–24
 Mr. J. Reid, 1924–25
 Dr. G. D. R. Black, 1925–26
 Mr. R. M. Dyer, 1926–27
 Mr. D. Templeton, 1927–28
 Mr. C. Gordon Mackie, 1928–29
 Mr. A. H. Ferguson, 1929–30
 Mr. T. H. R. Shaw, 1930–31
 Mr. A. Stevenson, 1931–32
 Mr. K. E. Greig, 1932–33
 Mr. A. L. Shields, 1933–34
 Mr. A. S. Mackichan, 1934–35
 Mr. J. C. Macgown, 1934–35
 Mr. R. M. Mclay, 1935–36
 Mr. W. Kay, 1936–37
 Sir Atholl Macgregor, 1937–38
 Dr. G. D. R. Black, 1939–40
 Mr. B. Wylie, 1940–41
 Mr. K. S. Morrison, 1941–42
 Mr. A. S. Mackichan, 1946–47
 Mr. J. F. Macgregor, 1947–48
 Mr. J. W. Anderson, 1948–49
 Mr. D. S. Robb, 1949–50
 Mr. J. Fennie, 1950–51
 Mr. A. S. Anderson, 1951–52
 Mr. D. L. Prophet, 1952–53
 Mr. J. Mckelvie, 1953–54
 Mr. H. R. M. Cleland, 1954–55
 Mr. J. A. Blackwood, 1955–56
 Mr. J. Moodie, 1956–57
 Mr. R. P. Moodie, 1957–58
 Mr. A. W. Black, 1958–59
 Mr. C. G. Smith, 1959–60
 Mr. J. F. Scott, 1960–61
 Sir John Kinloch, Bart., 1961–62
 Mr. J. B. H. Leckie, 1962–63
 Mr. R. G. L. Oliphant, 1963–64
 Mr. J. R. Leitch, 1964–65
 Dr. R. G. M. Wedderburn, 1965–66
 Sir Michael Herries, O.B.E., M.C., 1966–67
 Mr. K. A. Miller, 1967–68
 Mr. C. H. W. Robertson, 1968–69
 Mr. G. R. Ross, C.B.E., 1969–70
 Mr. O. L. Work, 1970–71
 Mr. A. G. S. McCallum, C.B.E., 1971–72
 Mr. J. D. Mackie, 1972–73
 Mr. M M. Smith, 1973–74
 Mr. T. T. Harley, 1974–75
 Mr. I. H. Macdonald, O.B.E., 1975–76
 Mr. L. W. Gordon, O.B.E., 1976–77
 Mr. A. B. McNutt, C.P.M., 1977–78
 Mr. D. J. T. Mckenzie, 1978–79
 Mr. H. H. Ross, M.B.E., 1979–80
 Sir William Purves, C.B.E., D.S.O., 1980–81
 Mr. D. W. McDonald, C.M.G., 1981–82
 Mr. R. T. M. Henry, M.V.O., O.B.E., Q.P.M., C.P.M., 1982–83
 Mr. J. M. Collins, 1983–84
 Dr. J. Park, 1984–85
 Mr. R. W. Campbell, 1985–86
 Mr. A. R. Hamilton, 1986–87
 Mr. S. Robertson, 1987–88
 Mr. A. H. Lamont, 1988–89
 Mr. J. E. Thornhill, 1989–90
 Mr. C. H. Wilken, 1990–91
 Mr. D. M. Watson, O.B.E., Q.P.M., C.P.M., 1991–92
 Mr. D. W. Gairns, 1992–93
 Mr. S. H. Leckie, O.B.E., 1993–94
 Mr. M. J. Moir, 1994–95
 Mr. R. Samuel, 1995–96
 Mr. M. K. Brown, 1996–97
 Mr. K. G. Morrison, 1997–98
 Mr. J. C. Lang, 1998–99
 Mr. J. Blaauw, 1999–2000
 Mr. G. Ure, 2000–01
 Mr. A. Morrison, 2001–02
 Mr. J. Budge, S.B.S., M.B.E., 2002–03
 Mr. M. Byres, 2003–04
 Mr. F. Innes, 2004–05
 Mr. G. Soutar, 2005–06
 Mr. R. Mckeown, 2006–07
 Mr. P. Curran, 2007–08
 Mr. J. Bruce, 2008–09
 Ms. F. J. Donnelly, 2009–10
 Mr. Neil Orvay, 2010–11
 Ms. J. Donaldson, 2011–12
 Mr. Alan Mctaggart, 2012–13
 Mr. Graeme Brechin, 2013–14
 Mr. S. Saunders , 2014–15
 Mr. Alan Forbes MacDonald, 2015–16
 Mr. Alan Dalgleish, 2016–17
 Mr. Charles McLaughlin, 2017–18
 Ms. Angela Lunn, 2018–19
 Mr. Roy Kinnear, 2019-20
 Mr. N. J. MacLeod, 2020-21
 Mrs Jenna Fitzgerald, 2021-22

References

External links
 Hong Kong St. Andrew's Society

1881 establishments in Hong Kong
Scottish diaspora in Asia
Gentlemen's clubs in Hong Kong